KSQM (91.5 FM) is a non-commercial, educational radio station broadcasting music largely from the 1940s to the 1960s and local news and weather reports.  Licensed to Sequim, Washington, United States, the station serves the northwest Washington area. It is currently owned by Sequim Community Broadcasting. KSQM's signal can be heard as far east as Anacortes, Washington, and west to  Port Angeles.

See also
List of community radio stations in the United States

References

External links

SQM
Community radio stations in the United States
Nostalgia radio in the United States